The New Zealand women's national cricket team toured Australia in November 1997. They played against Australia in three One Day Internationals, which were to contest the Rose Bowl. Australia won the series 2–1.

Squads

Tour Match

50-over match: New South Wales v New Zealand

WODI Series

1st ODI

2nd ODI

3rd ODI

References

External links
New Zealand Women tour of Australia 1997/98 from Cricinfo

Women's international cricket tours of Australia
1997 in Australian cricket
New Zealand women's national cricket team tours